Nong Bua Pittayakarn School  (commonly called: Buapit) is a Nongbua Lamphu Province Special secondary school in Thailand. Nong Bua Pittayakarn School is located in Udon Thani-Loei Strategic Road, Nong Bua Lamphu Municipality, Mueang District, Nong Bua Lamphu. The Department of General Education in the Ministry of Education is located in the city.  It is in the Buaban campus. Under the Office of the Secondary Educational Service Area Office 19.

History 
The school's establishment was approved on April 3, 1971. Admission for both male and female students opened in the first year. The Department of General Education governed elementary school systems in those days.

The first permanent building of the school was the central building (Now Building 3) and was built in 1973. The central building hosted eight classrooms encompassing a total area of 34 rais. The school started with three teachers and 90 students.  Slowly other buildings were added as the school grew.

In academic year 1975, the Ministry of Education ordered the dissolution and merger of Nong Bua Lamphu School. The boundary of the school is Nong Bua. On May 12, 1975, the school had grown to 19 teachers and 2 janitors.

The school joined the 13th school in 1976 and opened a secondary school. In 1992, it joined the Educational Opportunity Expansion Project.

Before the establishment of Nong Bua Lam Phu Province as a secondary school in Nong Bua Lam Phu. Udon Thani Province, the Nong Bua Lamphu Provincial Act was promulgated on December 1, 1993.

The school later came to educate about 3,200 students.

Director names

O-NET average  
This is the O-NET average of Nong Bua Pittayakarn School in 5 basic subjects, including math, science, social studies, English and Thai.

Orthur 
Website of Nongbuapittayakarn School
Website of The Secondary Education Area office 19

References

External links 
  
 

Secondary schools in Thailand
Schools in Nong Bua Lamphu Province